Program Trace Query Language (PTQL) is a language based on relational queries over program traces, in which programmers can write expressive, declarative queries about program behavior.

Sources

Conference on Object Oriented Programming Systems Languages and Applications  archive Proceedings of the 20th annual ACM SIGPLAN conference on Object oriented programming, systems, languages, and applications http://portal.acm.org/citation.cfm?id=1094811.1094841&coll=GUIDE&dl=GUIDE&CFID=10871926&CFTOKEN=54412436

External links
PTQL on Hyperic page

Query languages
Declarative programming languages